Players who neither had high enough rankings nor received wild cards to enter the main draw of the annual Wimbledon Tennis Championships participated in a qualifying tournament held one week before the event. Several players withdrew from the main draw after qualifying had commenced, leading to the highest ranked players who lost in the final qualifying round to be entered into the main draw as lucky losers.

The 1973 Wimbledon Championships featured an abnormally large number of qualifiers and lucky losers because 81 of the top Association of Tennis Professionals (ATP) players, including defending champion Stan Smith, boycotted the tournament in protest against the suspension of Nikola Pilić by the Yugoslav Tennis Association, supported by the International Lawn Tennis Federation (ILTF).

Qualifiers

Lucky losers

Qualifying draw

First qualifier

Second qualifier

Third qualifier

Fourth qualifier

Fifth qualifier

Sixth qualifier

Seventh qualifier

Eighth qualifier

Ninth qualifier

Tenth qualifier

Eleventh qualifier

Twelfth qualifier

Thirteenth qualifier

Fourteenth qualifier

Fifteenth qualifier

Sixteenth qualifier

Seventeenth qualifier

Eighteenth qualifier

Nineteenth qualifier

Twentieth qualifier

Twenty-first qualifier

Twenty-second qualifier

Twenty-third qualifier

Twenty-fourth qualifier

Twenty-fifth qualifier

Twenty-sixth qualifier

Twenty-seventh qualifier

Twenty-eighth qualifier

Twenty-ninth qualifier

Thirtieth qualifier

Thirty-first qualifier

Thirth-second qualifier

References

External links

 1973 Wimbledon Championships – Men's draws and results at the International Tennis Federation

Men's Singles Qualifying
Wimbledon Championship by year – Men's singles qualifying